The Serbia team for 2019 FIBA Basketball World Cup qualification represented Serbia at the 2019 FIBA Basketball World Cup qualification in Europe. The team was coached by Aleksandar Đorđević, with assistant coaches Miroslav Nikolić, Milan Minić, and Jovica Antonić. The team has qualified for the 2019 FIBA Basketball World Cup in China.

Timeline
 October 20, 2017: 35-man roster announced
 November 6, 2017: 24-man roster announced
 November 2017 – July 2018: First round
 September 2018 – February 2019: Second round

Roster
The following are all players who appeared at least in one game during the 2019 FIBA Basketball World Cup qualification:

Depth chart
Selected players (12/30) with 5 or more games played. Number in parentheses indicates how many times player was in a starting line-up.

Staff 

Source: KSS

Uniform

Supplier: Peak
Main sponsor: Triglav

Exhibition games 
Serbia played one exhibition game.

Qualification

First round – Group G

Austria (Home)

Georgia (Home)

Germany (Away)

Austria (Away)

Georgia (Away)

Germany (Home)

Second round – Group L

Greece (Away)

Estonia (Home)

Israel (Away)

Greece (Home)

Estonia (Away)

Israel (Home)

Statistics

See also 
 2017 Serbia EuroBasket team

References

External links
Official website
European Qualifiers Profile at FIBA Website

FIBA Basketball World Cup qualification
Serbia at the 2019 FIBA Basketball World Cup